Kotli Lions is a franchise cricket team that represents Kotli in the Kashmir Premier League. They were coached by Abdul Razzaq and captained by Kamran Akmal. Fakhar Zaman was originally appointed as captain but Kamran Akmal had to replace him due to the Pakistani tour of the West Indies.

Squad

Season standings

Points table

League fixtures and results

Statistics

Most runs 

Source:

Most wickets 

Source:

References

External links
 Team Records 2021 at ESPNcricinfo

Kashmir Premier League (Pakistan)